Velký Borek is a municipality and village in Mělník District in the Central Bohemian Region of the Czech Republic. It has about 1,200 inhabitants.

Administrative parts
Villages of Mělnická Vrutice and Skuhrov are administrative parts of Velký Borek.

References

Villages in Mělník District